The Bust of the Saviour (Salvator Mundi) is the last sculpture created by baroque artist Gian Lorenzo Bernini, who died from the after-effects of a stroke, when the artist was 81 years old. He left the sculpture in his will to his friend and patron queen Christina of Sweden. Considered lost and "rediscovered" in 2001, by Francesco Petrucci, it is currently held in the basilica of di San Sebastiano fuori le mura a Roma.

Dispute
However, there is some dispute over the authorship of the bust. The art historian Tomaso Montanari believes this version is not by Bernini, pointing instead to the version in the Chrysler Museum in Norfolk, USA, which the museum also attributes to Bernini.

See also
List of works by Gian Lorenzo Bernini

References

External links

Busts by Gian Lorenzo Bernini
Marble sculptures
Busts in Italy
Busts in the United States